Leki (born 28 January 1978) is an R&B and pop singer. She is known for many hits, including "Breakin' Out", "Spread My Wings", "Over the Rainbow", and "Love Me Another Day". She is also a TV presenter on VTM.

Leki started at the age of twelve laying down vocals for Technotronic. At the time, her older sister Ya Kid K was the lead singer of Technotronic, whose songs include the global hit "Pump Up the Jam".

In October 2009 she released her fourth studio album, "Leki & The Sweet Mints" (Universal Music).

Leki is also sensitive to humanitarian projects in Africa where she is the godmother of a young farmers development activity in Uganda.
Lately Leki decided to accomplish one of her father's dreams: the building of a hospital in his natal village of Malambu in Congo.
Via Nanda, the non-profit-making organization she has founded, and under the name "Bouwen aan leven" ("building life") several initiatives - such as the single "Peculiar Places" - have been taken since 2010 to help raise funds, hoping that the hospital will be operational towards the end of 2013.
On 14 May 2012 she released "Get Over", the first single from her 2012 album The Journey.

Discography

Albums
2004 Breakin Out
2005 Warrior Girl
2008 Multiplicity
2009 Leki & The Sweet Mints
2012 The Journey

Singles

Appears on

Awards and nominations

References

External links
www.lekimusic.com Leki's official website, including a full biography and discography.
Last FM profile of Leki
Leki profile on Facebook on Facebook.
Leki profile on YouTube on YouTube.

1978 births
Living people
English-language singers from Belgium
Rhythm and blues singers
People from Kinshasa
Democratic Republic of the Congo emigrants to Belgium
21st-century Belgian women singers
21st-century Belgian singers